is a multi-use stadium in Minami-ku, Sagamihara, Japan. It was formerly known as Sagamihara Asamizo Stadium since it is located in Sagamihara Asamizo Park

Since the naming rights. were sold in March 2014 it has been called Sagamihara Gion Stadium. It is currently used mostly for football matches and athletics events and is the home ground of SC Sagamihara. This stadium has a seating capacity of 11,808.

References

External links
 Official website 

2007 establishments in Japan
Sports venues completed in 2007
Athletics (track and field) venues in Japan
Football venues in Japan
Rugby union stadiums in Japan
Buildings and structures in Sagamihara
Sports venues in Kanagawa Prefecture
SC Sagamihara